Alberto del Moral Saelices (born 20 July 2000) is a Spanish footballer who plays as a midfielder for Villarreal CF B.

Club career
Born in Villacañas, Toledo, Castilla–La Mancha, del Moral was a Córdoba CF youth graduate. He made his senior debut with the reserves on 14 April 2019, starting in a 3–0 Tercera División home loss against Betis Deportivo Balompié.

Del Moral started the 2020–21 season with the first team in Segunda División B, and renewed his contract until 2023 on 1 February 2021, being definitely promoted to the main squad. On 14 June, he moved to Villarreal CF's B-team also in the third level, on a three-year deal.

Del Moral was a regular starter for the Yellow Submarine during the 2021–22 campaign, as the side achieved promotion to Segunda División. He made his professional debut with the B-side on 14 August 2022, starting in a 2–0 away win over Racing de Santander.

References

External links

2000 births
Living people
Sportspeople from the Province of Toledo
Spanish footballers
Footballers from Castilla–La Mancha
Association football midfielders
Segunda División players
Primera Federación players
Segunda División B players
Tercera División players
Córdoba CF B players
Córdoba CF players
Villarreal CF B players